Serena Dipierro is an Italian mathematician whose research involves partial differential equations, the regularity of their solution, their phase transitions, nonlocal operators, and free boundary problems, with applications including population dynamics, quantum mechanics, crystallography, and mathematical finance. She is a professor in the School of Physics, Mathematics and Computing at the University of Western Australia, where she heads the department of mathematics and statistics.

Education and career
After earning a laurea at the University of Bari in 2006, and a master's degree with Lorenzo D’Ambrosio at the same university in 2008, Dipierro finished a Ph.D. in mathematics at the International School for Advanced Studies in Trieste in 2012. Her dissertation, Concentration phenomena for singularly perturbed elliptic problems and related topics, was supervised by Andrea Malchiodi.

She was a postdoctoral researcher at the University of Chile and University of Edinburgh, and a Humboldt Fellow, and a faculty member at the University of Melbourne and University of Milan before taking her present position at the University of Western Australia in 2018.

Book

Recognition
Dipierro is the 2021 winner of the Australian Mathematical Society Medal.

References

External links

Year of birth missing (living people)
Living people
Italian mathematicians
Italian women mathematicians
Australian mathematicians
Australian women mathematicians
University of Bari alumni
Academic staff of the University of Melbourne
Academic staff of the University of Milan
Academic staff of the University of Western Australia